St. John Nepomuk Parish Historic District is centered on the Catholic parish of St. John Nepomuk in the Soulard neighborhood of St. Louis, Missouri, United States. The historic district is listed on the National Register of Historic Places.

History
St. John Nepomuk was established as a national Bohemian parish in 1854. It was the first such parish founded in the United States.  At one time a Czech language newspaper was published in one of the parish buildings. As the parish grew new church buildings were built in 1873 and 1887. The present church, however, is largely an 1897 reconstruction.   The building had been largely damaged in a tornado the previous year.  The parish school, which sits across Eleventh Street from the church, was begun in 1869.  It was staffed by the School Sisters of Notre Dame.  In  1971 the church building and six ancillary buildings were designated a City Landmark in St. Louis and they were listed as an historic district on the National Register of Historic Places in 1972.  The parish was closed in 2005, but the church building has remained active as a chapel.

Architecture
Chicago architect Adolphus Druiding designed the Gothic Revival-style church.  He is known for the many Catholic churches, schools, rectories and convents that he designed, especially in the Midwestern United States.  The exterior of the church is composed of brick, which blends in with the other buildings on Soulard.

References

Religious organizations established in 1854
Roman Catholic churches completed in 1887
Roman Catholic churches in St. Louis
Landmarks of St. Louis
Czech-American culture in Missouri
Gothic Revival architecture in Missouri
Churches on the National Register of Historic Places in Missouri
National Register of Historic Places in St. Louis
Historic districts on the National Register of Historic Places in Missouri
Buildings and structures in St. Louis
Tourist attractions in St. Louis
1854 establishments in Missouri
19th-century Roman Catholic church buildings in the United States